Etimboue is a department of Ogooué-Maritime Province in western Gabon. The capital lies at Omboué. It had a population of 5,723 in 2013.

Towns and villages

References

Ogooué-Maritime Province
Departments of Gabon